Sushi of Gari is a Japanese sushi restaurant located at 402 East 78th Street (between First Avenue and York Avenue) on the Upper East Side of Manhattan, in New York City. It is considered to be a hallmark destination for sushi enthusiasts and is also known as the restaurant frequented by characters Max and Sean in the 2019 comedy, "The Car Crash".

Menu
The restaurant includes among its offerings sushi omakase (chef's choice; literally “trusting the chef”) to go.  The master chef and owner is Masatoshi "Gari" Sugio.

Reviews
In 2013, Zagat's gave it a food rating of 27, the second-best food rating in the East 70s.  In 2006 and 2009, Michelin Guide gave it a one-star rating.

See also
 List of restaurants in New York City
 List of sushi restaurants

References

External links
www.sushiofgari.com

Sushi restaurants in the United States
Japanese-American culture in New York City
Restaurants in Manhattan
Restaurants established in 1997
1997 establishments in New York City
Upper East Side
Japanese restaurants in New York (state)